Flesze  is a village in the administrative district of Gmina Grajewo, within Grajewo County, Podlaskie Voivodeship, in north-eastern Poland. A small pond lies at the center of the village, which, during the season, is a popular destination for local fishermen.

References

Flesze